The metabolic window (also called the anabolic window or protein window) is a term used in strength training to describe the 15-minute (give or take, dependent on the individual) period after exercise during which nutrition can shift the body from a catabolic state to an anabolic one. Specifically, it is during this period that the intake of protein and carbohydrates can aid in the increase of muscle mass.

Currently there is not sufficient scientific evidence to support the metabolic window theory.

The metabolic window is based on your body's anabolic response. Anabolism is when small molecules grow into bigger complex molecules. This is the opposite to catabolism, when larger molecules break down in the body. During anabolism, the molecules form into new larger cells and tissues.

After strength training, your body is anabolic. This physical state requires a lot of cellular processes to take place for muscle repair and growth. These processes are fueled by nutrients called protein and carbohydrates. The associated benefits to hitting the metabolic window of 30 minutes or less include increasing protein synthesis, reducing muscle protein breakdown and replenishing muscle glycogen. These are all processes that take place at a slow rate in the body and by pumping your body full of nutrients immediately after a workout, allows your body to increase the rate of repair and hopefully gain more muscle mass.

There are also other factors that come into play when discussing the metabolic window theory. Some of these factors include how muscle protein breakdown (MPB) and muscle protein synthesis (MPS) interact, and the timing if protein consumption prior to or following a workout. The most well proven variable to muscle building is progressive overload, which involves lifting more resistance over time, to which the muscles adapt.

Fasted Exercise 
The evidence for replenishing depleted energy levels only relates when they are completely gone at the beginning of training, such as during fasted exercise. This is where large amounts of the day go by without any eating to spike and deplete energy levels to trick the body, followed by a training session (with low levels of nutritional energy) to force the body to be uncomfortable. Following this, the body is at an abnormally low level of various nutrients (such as carbohydrates and proteins), which are then put back into the body to force an even higher adaptation in the body. During fasted exercise, an increase in muscle protein breakdown causes the pre-exercise negative amino acid level to continue in the post exercise period despite increases in muscle protein synthesis. This is why it would make sense to provide immediate nutritional replenishment after exercise as there was already such a low level before training started. This would turn the catabolic state of the body into an anabolic one and therefore, promote the metabolic window as desirable. This means more or less that the body is so used to receiving food that when you starve yourself, the body does not know what to do, so it enters a panic mode where you push yourself through a depleted state, and then finally feed yourself and the body absorbs even more of the nutrients and only takes the ones needed. An example of this diet would be Intermittent Fasting.

Glycogen 
Glycogen is one of the primary replenishments after exercise. Glycogen is considered essential to training at levels needed for muscle hypertrophy, responsible for as much as 80% of ATP production during workouts. Due to such involvement of glycogen in the body during training, it is suggested that we replenish these levels after training. Glycogen comes in the form of carbohydrates such as potatoes, rice, bread and pasta. This can also be taken care of with a post training drink such as a recovery shake. These glycogen stores do recover over time though because they are already high enough after training to not cause any serious effect on the bodies production if following a regular eating plan (3-4 meals a day).

Some theorists believe the metabolic window begins to close within minutes of the end of a workout. They claim the same nutrients taken two hours later result in significantly reduced protein synthesis and muscle glycogen storage.

Muscle Protein Breakdown and Muscle Protein Synthesis 
Muscle protein synthesis (MPS) is the metabolic process of building muscle mass. Muscle protein breakdown (MPB) is the opposite process of breaking down muscular tissue. Muscle protein breakdown and muscle protein synthesis occur concurrently, meaning there is a constant renewal of protein in the body. The net muscle protein balance (NBAL) is the relationship between muscle protein breakdown and muscle protein synthesis. It is determined by the stability between the two processes. The anabolic state theory suggests that it is critical to consume proteins and carbohydrates immediately after resistance training to increase muscle protein synthesis, reduce muscle protein breakdown, and replenish glycogen levels in the muscle. In response to resistance training, muscle protein breakdown increases but it does not increase as much as protein synthesis. Since eating proteins and carbs immediately after exercising is known to reduce MPB, it is also assumed that in doing so, this will increase lean muscle mass by increasing the net protein balance. Muscle protein breakdown targets many types of proteins including damaged proteins and proteins that are rapidly turning over. To increase mass muscle size, changes depend on myofibrillar proteins and MPB would need to target these proteins specifically. Since MPB affects multiple types of protein, limiting protein breakdown through post-workout nutrition will hinder proper recovery by degrading the essential proteins for rebuilding muscle. According to a study performed in 2010, it found that it is not necessary to include large amounts of carbohydrates in post-workout nutrition since there are nutrient solutions that contain enough Essential amino acids and an adequate amount of carbohydrates to produce the maximum anabolic protein response.

Protein Intake Before and After Workout 
The purpose of this small 2017 study was to test the anabolic theory and the effect of consuming the same amount of protein before and after resistance training on muscle strength, hypertrophy, and body composition changes. There were 21 subjects of the study involved in the study. All were men that participated in resistance training with more than one year of experience. These subjects were all recruited from a university setting and were all given an equal dose of protein consumed immediately either before working out or post-training. All participants were natural athletes, meaning they had no history of anabolic steroid usage. The subjects of the study were all paired based on their strength in the squat and bench press exercises. The pairs were then put into two different control groups. One group consumed 25 grams of protein and 1 gram of carbohydrates before the workout and the other control group was given the same amount of protein and carbohydrates post-workout. The study consisted of a full-body routine that ran on three-week sessions on nonconsecutive days for ten weeks. The results of this study showed that the protein consumption before the workout and after the workout had shown similar effects on all the subjects studied. This scientific evidence shows that the anabolic window, which is quite narrow, is false and although it does increase MPB after training, the effects are very short. This supporting evidence also points to the fact that the interval for the anabolic window may be as big as several hours or maybe even more depending on the timing of protein intake before the workout.

See also
 Anaerobic exercise
 Bodybuilding
 Nutrient timing
 Powerlifting
 Resistance training
 Weightlifting

References

Exercise physiology
Physical exercise
Sports nutrition